Ida Emma Charlotta Gisiko-Spärck (1859–1940) was a Swedish painter who became a member of the Önningeby artists colony on Åland. She is remembered for her landscapes in oils.

Biography
Born on 18 November 1859 in Stockholm, Ida Gisiko was the daughter of the wholesale merchant Karl Samuel Gisiko. Her brother Carl Edvard was married to Ida Björck, the sister of the Swedish artist Oscar Björck. She studied in Paris at the end of the 1890s. She was a friend of the Finnish artist Hanna Rönnberg both in Paris and in Önningeby where she joined the artists colony.

In 1894, she married the Danish administrator Johan Albert Spärck and moved to Denmark. She died in 1940.

References

1859 births
1940 deaths
Artists from Stockholm
Swedish painters
Swedish women artists